Alejandro Falla and Eduardo Struvay were the defending champions but chose not to defend their title.

Darian King and Miguel Ángel Reyes-Varela won the title after defeating Nicolás Jarry and Roberto Quiroz 6–4, 6–4 in the final.

Seeds

Draw

References
 Main Draw

Claro Open Medellín - Doubles
2017 Doubles